Lichfield City is one of two railway stations serving the city of Lichfield, in Staffordshire, England. The station, and all trains serving it, are operated by West Midlands Railway.

History

Early years

The station opened in 1849, on the South Staffordshire Railway's line from Lichfield Trent Valley to Walsall and Dudley.  This later became part of the London and North Western Railway. The architect for the South Staffordshire Railway was Mr Edward Adams of London and the station building built in 1849 was a modest creation in a Tudor style, with tall gables and chimneys. Services to Birmingham began in 1884, when a branch to Sutton Coldfield opened, connecting with an earlier LNWR line. This original station was demolished in 1882 when the present one was built to accommodate these additional services. The original station stood further east than the present one. It was approached from the city by a path which ran across Levett's Field and up some brick steps in front of the station, these can still be seen near the present Fire Station.

Recent history

Passenger trains northwards via Trent Valley station to  ceased in January 1965, along with trains to Walsall so Lichfield City became the northern terminus of the line from Birmingham.  This later became part of the Cross-City Line.  In 1988 under British Rail, the line was extended back to Trent Valley.  Lichfield City has retained considerable character.

The line to Walsall subsequently closed to all traffic in March 1984, except for the portion as far as Anglesey sidings (near Hammerwich), which was retained to serve a Charringtons oil terminal.  Traffic from there ceased in 2002 and the line has been disused since then (though the track remains intact).

In June 1990 the station was in the news after a trainee soldier, William Robert Davies, aged 19, was shot and killed, and two other new recruits were wounded, whilst they were awaiting a train to Birmingham. They had been shot by two Provisional IRA gunmen. A plaque commemorating the incident is situated in the station.

The South Staffordshire Line
The South Staffordshire Line from Lichfield Trent Valley to Burton on Trent is often used for diversions (when the route via  is closed for engineering work), as well as for occasional freight trains and empty stock transfers.

In a strategy which has been conducted by the West Midlands Combined Authority. The line from Walsall to Lichfield has been identified as a disused rail corridor and this means that it is a long-term ambition to reopen the line from Walsall to Lichfield. As either a rail/light rail corridor, which considers the line to be reopened for either rail or tram trains. There is also aspirations to reconnect the disused line at Wednesbury to Walsall as either rail or tram.

Consideration is also being given to the reintroduction of trains to Burton and Derby. Services north of Lichfield City currently terminate at Lichfield Trent Valley, with the line beyond only used by freight, access to the Barton train maintenance depot, occasional cross country services and as a diversionary route. A short term option may be a diesel shuttle service with longer-term ambitions to electrify the line and provide stations at Barton Under Needwood and Alrewas.

Facilities
The station has a staffed ticket office, located at street level on Station Road.  This is open throughout the week from early morning until mid-evening.  A self-service ticket machine is also provided in the ticket hall for use when the ticket office is closed or for collecting pre-paid tickets.  At platform level, there are toilets and a waiting room.  Customer help points, CIS displays and automated announcements provide train running information.  Step-free access is available to both the ticket hall and platforms (the latter via lift from the subway).

Bridge
Immediately adjacent to the station is a bridge which carries the rail lines over the busy A51. The bridge is frequently struck by heavy goods traffic on the road below, forcing rail traffic to and from Shenstone to reduce speed over the bridge as a safety precaution. The bridge is the fourth most struck bridge in the country.

Services
The station is served by West Midlands Trains with local Transport for West Midlands branded "Cross-City" services, operated by Class 323 electrical multiple units with an average journey time to Lichfield Trent Valley of 3 minutes and to Birmingham New Street of around 29 minutes.

Mondays to Saturdays
On Mondays to Saturdays, two trains per operate southbound; to Bromsgrove via Longbridge, calling at all stations except Duddeston. Northbound there are also two trains per hour, to Lichfield Trent Valley.

Sundays
On Sundays, there are trains every 30 minutes in each direction trains, southbound to Redditch, and two per hour northbound to Lichfield Trent Valley.

References

External links

Lichfield
Railway stations in Staffordshire
DfT Category D stations
Former London and North Western Railway stations
Railway stations in Great Britain opened in 1849
Railway stations in Great Britain closed in 1884
Railway stations in Great Britain opened in 1884
Railway stations served by West Midlands Trains
1849 establishments in England